Bulok  or Bulock is a small town in south-western Gambia. It is located in the Brikama Division.  As of 2009, it has an estimated population of 2312.

References

Populated places in the Gambia